Cell Stem Cell is a peer-reviewed scientific journal published by Cell Press, an imprint of Elsevier.

History
The journal was established in 2007 and focuses on stem cell research. 

Both research articles and reviews are published, at about a 7 to 1 ratio.

References

External links

Stem Cell Therapy
Stem Cell Treatment

Monthly journals
Stem cell research
Developmental biology journals
English-language journals
Delayed open access journals
Cell Press academic journals
Publications established in 2007